is a highway on the island of Honshu in Japan. It originates at Nihonbashi in Chūō, Tokyo, and terminates in the city of Niigata (the capital of Niigata Prefecture), where it meets National Routes 7, 8, 49, 113 and 116).

National Route 17 measures 350.3 km in length. It incorporates parts of two ancient highways, the Nakasendō and Mikuni Kaidō. The newer Kan-Etsu Expressway parallels National Route 17.

In addition to Chūō, National Route 17 passes through Itabashi. It links the prefectural capitals of Saitama (Saitama Prefecture) and Maebashi (Gunma Prefecture).

Route data
 Length: 351.1 km (217.7 mi)
 Origin: Nihonbashi, Chūō, Tokyo (originates at junction with Routes 1, 4, 6, 14, 15 and 20)
 Terminus: Chuo-ku, Niigata (ends at Junction with Routes 7, 8, 49, 113 and 116)
 Major cities: Saitama, Kumagaya, Takasaki, Maebashi, Shibukawa, Numata, Minami-Uonuma, Nagaoka, Sanjo

Other names
 4 December 1952: First Class National Highway 17 (Tokyo to Niigata)
 1 April 1965: General National Highway 17 (Tokyo to Niigata)

Gallery

References

017
Roads in Gunma Prefecture
Roads in Niigata Prefecture
Roads in Saitama Prefecture
Roads in Tokyo